Asya Pereltsvaig (born 1972) is a Russian-American linguist, writer, and educator. Pereltsvaig was born in Leningrad, USSR.

Life
Her research interests are theoretical syntax, cross-linguistic typology, Slavic linguistics, and historical linguistics. Her recent books include: The Indo-European Controversy: Facts and Fallacies in Historical Linguistics (2015, with Martin Lewis) and Languages of the World: An Introduction (third edition, 2020). She has been published in Science, Natural Language and Linguistic Theory, Language and Linguistics Compass, and elsewhere. She has taught in Yale, Cornell, and Stanford universities. She has a PhD in Linguistics from McGill University.

In 1990, she emigrated to Israel, after which she made her way to the Bay Area, San Francisco, California.

References

1972 births
Linguists
Living people
21st-century Russian non-fiction writers
21st-century Russian women writers
Writers from Saint Petersburg
Slavists
Women linguists